The Council of Ministers is the supreme executive organ of the Federal Government of the Kingdom of Belgium. It is a cabinet composed of the Prime Minister, who leads it, and up to fourteen senior ministers. Federal secretaries of state (junior ministers) are members of the government, but not part of the Council. The King of the Belgians historically presided over the Council, but this has not happened since 1957. The Council of Ministers formally became a permanent policy structure with the constitutional revision of 1970.

List Council of Belgium 

The De Croo Government is the incumbent Federal Government of Belgium, to be led by Prime Minister Alexander De Croo from 1 October 2020.

References

Belgium
Government of Belgium